Matthew Alan Roy (born March 1, 1995) is an American professional ice hockey defenseman. He is currently playing for the Los Angeles Kings of the National Hockey League (NHL). He was selected in the seventh round, 194th overall, by the Kings in the 2015 NHL Entry Draft.

Playing career
Roy spent three seasons playing Tier 1 Elite Hockey League hockey with Victory Honda, serving as captain for the U18 team in his last season, before joining the Indiana Ice in the United States Hockey League. He was one of six players on the Indiana Ice from Michigan to win the 2014 Clark Cup. After the Indiana Ice disbanded following the 2013–2014 season, Roy's playing rights were sent to the Dubuque Fighting Saints.

Collegiate
Roy began his freshman season at Michigan Tech playing in 36 games during the 2014–15 season. His plus-minus rating ranked third amongst freshman in the NCAA as the Huskies ranked second in the conference. After his freshman season, Roy was drafted 194th overall by the Los Angeles Kings in the 2015 NHL Entry Draft.

In his sophomore season, Roy played in 37 games and recorded a then-career high 20 points. He finished the season ranked third among WCHA defensemen in points and was selected for the All-WCHA Second Team. His junior season was also successful offensively, with Roy putting up a career high 23 points and being named to the All-WCHA First Team. He was also the co-winner of the team's MVP award, the Merv Youngs Award.

Professional
After completing his junior season with the Michigan Tech Huskies of the Western Collegiate Hockey Association, Roy was signed to a two-year, entry-level contract with the Kings on March 27, 2017. He immediately joined the Kings' AHL affiliate, the Ontario Reign, on an amateur try-out for the remainder of the 2016–17 season.

After attending the Kings training camp, Roy was reassigned to the Reign for the 2018–19 season. On February 16, 2019, Roy was called up to the NHL after playing in 44 games with the Reign. He made his NHL debut that night in a 4–2 loss to the Boston Bruins. Roy recorded his first career assist on Austin Wagner's goal in a 3–1 loss to the Nashville Predators.

Roy suffered a concussion after he was boarded by Minnesota Wild forward Kevin Fiala on January 28, 2021. Fiala was suspended 3 games for the hit from behind.

On March 21, 2021, Roy signed a three-year, $9.45 million contract extension with the Kings.

Career statistics

Regular season and playoffs

International

Awards and honours

References

External links

1995 births
Living people
Indiana Ice players
Los Angeles Kings draft picks
Los Angeles Kings players
Michigan Tech Huskies men's ice hockey players
Ontario Reign (AHL) players
American men's ice hockey defensemen